The Sverdlov-class cruisers, Soviet designation Project 68bis, were the last conventional gun cruisers built for the Soviet Navy. They were built in the 1950s and were based on Soviet, German, and Italian designs and concepts developed prior to the Second World War. They were modified to improve their sea capabilities, allowing them to operate at high speeds in the rough waters of the North Atlantic. The basic hull was more modern and had better armor protection than other post-World War II gun cruiser designs built and deployed by other nations. They also carried an extensive suite of modern radar equipment and anti-aircraft artillery. The Soviets originally planned to build 40 ships in the class, to be supported by the s and aircraft carriers.

Stalin, along with the leadership of the Soviet Navy wanted a ship which kept a naval doctrine focused on three priorities: supporting the defense of the Soviet coastline, operating out of naval bases worldwide, and protecting Soviet Arctic, Baltic, Mediterranean and Black Sea interests. Secondary missions envisioned for this class of ship were commerce raiding and political presence in the third world, but they were considered obsolete for the missile age (in which defensive and anti submarine resources were the priority) by Soviet Premier Khrushchev and the Soviet Defence staff, who grudgingly conceded only some cruisers for limited roles as flagships in strategic and tactical naval operations. Within the Soviet Navy in 1959, leading admirals still believed that more big cruisers would be useful in the sort of operations planned in Cuba and in support of Indonesia. This ship was a response to that.

The Sverdlovs were also a threat to the British and Dutch navies, which had lacked 24-hour day/night carrier capability before satellite surveillance.

The big ship threat to the Royal Navy was real, and was useful to it in justifying conventional fleet and carrier construction, especially in the North Atlantic. The response was to introduce the Blackburn Buccaneer, a carrier-based strike aircraft that had the performance required to approach and attack Sverdlov-class ships at ultra low level, using toss bombing attacks to deliver nuclear ordnance, while remaining outside the 5 km effective range of the Soviet 100 mm and 37 mm guns. When the building program was cut back and the battlecruisers and carriers were cancelled, the Sverdlovs were left dangerously unprotected when operating in areas outside the cover of land-based aircraft. Their secondary mission, operating on their own as commerce raiders, was also compromised as they would be extremely vulnerable, in good weather, to USN Carrier Battle Groups equipped with modern strike aircraft and to the remaining - and -class cruisers equipped with 8-inch guns. (The Royal Navy's last, - and -class gun cruisers, and the USN's - and -class destroyers, lacked armour, range and speed required to counter the Sverdlovs.)

In 1954 Sverdlov class construction was cancelled by Khrushchev after 14 hulls had been completed. Two additional hulls were scrapped on the slip and four partially complete Sverdlovs launched in 1954 were scrapped in 1959. The remaining ships remained in service through the 1970s, when they underwent a limited modernization program before finally leaving service in the late 1980s.

The only remaining ship of the class, Mikhail Kutuzov, is preserved in Novorossiysk.

History 
At the end of the Second World War, Joseph Stalin planned a major modernisation and expansion of the Soviet Navy, to turn it into a global blue-water navy. Large numbers of cruisers were required, with roles including escorting heavier ships and leading destroyers. To speed production, it was decided to build an improved version of the pre-war  (or Project 68), the Sverdlov (or Project 68B) instead of a wholly new design (Project 65). The design for the Sverdlov class was formally approved on 27 May 1947. Some sources state that 30 Sverdlovs were initially planned, with the order being cut by five in favour of the three s, but others state that the total of 30 includes the five Chapayevs. The first three ships of the class were named after cancelled ships of the Chapayev class. Following the death of Stalin in 1953, this order was cut to 21. Once the first fifteen hulls were laid down, the Soviet Navy decided that the remaining six ships be completed to a modified design (Project 68zif) with provisions for protection against nuclear fallout, but none were completed. Plans were developed and drawings were created to upgrade the ships to support a cruise missile capability; however, these plans were dropped and new construction was cancelled in 1959. Incomplete ships except Admiral Kornilov (which became a hulk) were scrapped by 1961.

Reductions in cruiser force levels was contrary to the views of Soviet Navy leadership, which insisted cruisers still provided a valuable capability to act as command ships for naval gunfire support of amphibious operations. They also thought they would provide a political presence in contested areas of the third world, e.g. Cuba and Indonesia. Had more Sverdlovs been available at the time of the Cuban Missile Crisis in 1962, they would certainly have been deployed. The Soviet Navy intended to base several older Chapayev class cruisers at Cuban ports, had the operation succeeded.

These ships were outclassed as surface combatants, due to their lack of an anti-ship cruise missile capability. The limited modernization of those ships still in service in the 1970s relegated them to service as naval gunfire support platforms.

The standard Soviet practice was to pass the cruisers in and out of reserve status. Most were relegated to a reserve status by the early 1980s.

Today, only one of the ships remains: the Mikhail Kutuzov. It is a museum ship in Novorossiysk.

Design 
They had the same main armament, machinery and side protection as the earlier ships, but had increased fuel capacity for greater range, an all welded hull, improved underwater protection, increased anti-aircraft artillery and radar.

The Sverdlov class displaced 13,600 tons standard and 16,640 tons at full load. The hull was a completely welded new design and the ships had a double bottom for over 75% of their length. The ship also had 23 watertight bulkheads. The Sverdlovs had six boilers providing steam to two geared steam turbines generating  to their shafts.

Sverdlov-class cruisers main armament included twelve /57 cal B-38 guns mounted in four triple Mk5-bis turrets. They also had twelve /56 cal Model 1934 guns in six twin SM-5-1 mounts. For anti-aircraft weaponry, the cruisers had thirty-two  anti-aircraft guns in sixteen twin mounts and were also equipped with ten  torpedo tubes in two mountings of five each.

The Sverdlovs had   belt armor and had a   armored deck. The turrets were shielded by  armor and the conning tower, by  armor.

The cruisers' ultimate radar suite included one 'Big Net' or 'Top Trough' air search radar, one 'High Sieve' or 'Low Sieve' air search radar, one 'Knife Rest' air search radar and one 'Slim Net' air search radar. For navigational radar they had one 'Don-2' or 'Neptune' model. For fire control purposes the ships were equipped with two 'Sun Visor' radars, two 'Top Bow' 152 mm gun radars and eight 'Egg Cup' gun radars. For electronic countermeasures the ships were equipped with two 'Watch Dog' ECM systems.

Modifications
By the early 1960s, the torpedo tubes were removed from all ships of the class. In 1957 the Admiral Nakhimov had a KSShch (NATO reporting name: SS-N-1 "Scrubber") anti-ship missile launcher installed to replace "A" and "B" turrets. The modification was designated Project 68ER. This trial installation was not successful and the ship was rapidly decommissioned and used as a target ship in 1961.

Dzerzhinsky had a SAM launcher for the M-2 Volkhov-M missile (SA-N-2 "Guideline"), which replaced the third or "X" main gun turret in 1960–62, with the designation Project 70E.  and no further ships were converted. As the entire missile installation was above the armored deck and the missile itself, based on the S-75 Dvina (SA-2 "Guideline"), was liquid-fueled (acid/kerosene), it would have represented a serious hazard to the ship in action.

Zhdanov and Senyavin were converted to command ships in 1971 by replacing the "X" turret with extra accommodation and electronics, four twin AK-230 30 mm guns, and a 4K33 "Osa-M" (SA-N-4 "Gecko") Surface-to-Air Missile (SAM) system. Senyavin also had the "Y" turret removed to make room for a helicopter deck and hangar, and four additional AK-230 mounts installed atop the Osa-M missile system. Zhdanov and Senyavin were respectively designated Project 68U1 and Project 68U2.

Oktyabrskaya Revolyutsia was refitted with an enlarged bridge in 1977, with Admiral Ushakov and Aleksandr Suvorov receiving the same modification in 1979, and later, Mikhail Kutusov. These ships had four of their 37 mm twin mounts removed, and eight 30 mm AK-230 mounts were added. These ships were designated Project 68A.

Ships

Gallery

See also
List of ships of the Soviet Navy
List of ships of Russia by project number

References

Citations

Sources

External links 

  Article in Russian language
  Pictures of Murmansk (Мурманск) at Hasvik
  All Russian Sverdlov Class Cruisers - Complete Ship List

Cruiser classes